The Underseas Explorers is an American TV series  aired in 1961.

Characters
Professor Scott as Himself
Bobby Scott as Professor Scott's grandson
Bill Kincaid as The Submarine Navigator
Rhombi as The Native Island Boy
Jacques Duvall as Underwater Diving Expert
Dr. Claude Meecham as The Ship's Doctor

External links

Official Website

American children's animated adventure television series